The 2016 Peru Cup season, the largest amateur tournament of Peruvian football, started in February.

This edition has featured a change, with the elimination of the Regional Stage and the inclusion of participants from all the Regions of Peru in the National Stage. Under the new format, the tournament has four stages. The first three stages are played as mini-league round-robin tournaments, and the fourth stage is played under POT System intellectual property of the MatchVision company.

The creator of this format is the Chilean Leandro A. Shara

The 2016 Peru Cup started with the District Stage in February.  The next stage was the Provincial Stage which started in June. The tournament continued with the Departmental Stage in July. The National Stage starts in September. The winner of the National Stage will be promoted to the First Division and the runner-up will be promoted to the Second Division.

Departmental stage
Departmental Stage: 2016 Ligas Departamentales del Peru and 2016 Ligas Superiores del Peru

The following list shows the teams that qualified for the National Stage.

National stage
In 2016 the National Stage has grown to 50 teams, and the new National Stage, designed by matchVision, is played under Regional using the POT System, with all the Regions of Peru represented. The National Stage starts in the first week of September.

This phase features the 50 teams that qualified from the Departmental Stage. Each team plays 3 games at home and 3 games away, for a total of 6 games against 3 different geographical rivals. The departmental stage winners only play against departmental runners-up, and vice versa. All the teams are positioned in one general table. After 6 matches, the team in places 1 to 8 are qualified directly to the Round of 16, while the teams in places 9 to 24 will play the Repechage phase. The teams in places 25 to 50 are eliminated.

The winner of the National Stage will be promoted to the 2017 Torneo Descentralizado and the runner-up of the National Stage will be promoted to the 2017 Peruvian Segunda División.

Tie-breaking criteria 
The ranking of teams in the Unique Table is based on the following criteria:
 1.	Number of Points
 2.	Number of Relative Points, which are calculated by multiplying the points obtained against each rival with the total points obtained by this rival.
 3.	Goal difference
 4.	Number of goals scored
 5.	Better performance in away matches based on the following criteria:
        1.	Number of Away Points
        2.	Number of Away Relative Points
        3.	Goal Difference in away games
        4.	Number of goals scored in away games
 6.	Number of First-Half points: considering the half-time results as the final results
 6.	Drawing of lots

League table

Round 1

|-

|-
|}

Round 2

|-

|-
|}

Round 3

|-

|-
|}

Round 4

|-

|-
|}

Round 5

|-

{{OneLegResult|Coronel Bolognesi || 1–2 | 'Binacional}}

|-
|}

Round 6

|-

|-
|}

Repechage

Round of 16

Quarterfinals

Final group stage
The final group stage, colloquially known as La Finalísima'', will be played by the four semifinalist at the Estadio Nacional in Lima. The team with the most points will be declared the winner and be promoted to the 2017 Torneo Descentralizado. The runner-up will be promoted to the 2017 Peruvian Segunda División. The draw for this stage of the tournament took place 30 November 2016 at the Peruvian Football Federation's headquarters.

Round 1

Round 2

Round 3

See also
 2016 Torneo Descentralizado
 2016 Peruvian Segunda División

References

External links
 Official Website
  Dechalaca Copa Peru
  Semanario Pasión

2016
Peru
2016 in Peruvian football